Fenix, Fénix (Spanish and Portuguese) and Fênix (Brazilian Portuguese) all mean phoenix and may refer to:

Business
 Fenix Automotive, a British supercar manufacturer founded by Lee Noble in 2009
 Fénix Directo, a Spanish insurance company
 Fenix Project, a GNU project to make a free compiler of a scripting language for video-game development
 Synton Fenix, a modular synthesizer
 El Fenix (restaurant), a chain of restaurants in Texas, U.S.

Entertainment
 Fenix (magazine) (also Feniks), a Polish science fiction magazine published from 1990 to 2001
 Marcus Fenix, the main character of the video game Gears of War
 Praetor Fenix, a fictional character in the StarCraft series and Heroes of the Storm
 Fenix, a 2017 Dutch-Belgium television series starring Teun Luijkx

Music
 Fenix TX, a punk band
 Fénix (Gato Barbieri album), a 1971 album by Gato Barbieri
 Fénix (Nicky Jam album), a 2017 album by Nicky Jam

Places
 Fênix, a town in Brazil, 5,000 population
 Fénix Grande River, a river in Argentina

Sports
 Club Atlético Fénix, an Argentine football club
 Centro Atlético Fénix, a Uruguayan football club
 Fênix 2005 Futebol Clube, a Brazilian football club

Other uses
 Fenix (gamer), South Korean professional League of Legends player
 Fénix (wrestler) (born 1990), Mexican professional wrestler
 Fénix capsules, rescue capsules used in the 2010 Copiapó mining accident
 El Fénix (automobile)
 CX 40 Radio Fénix, a Uruguayan radio station
 Garmin Fenix, a line of GPS smartwatches
 Shoalwater (sidewheeler 1852), a former name of the Willamette River steamer Fenix
 Fenix, the codename of the Mozilla Firefox for Android web browser

See also
 
 Feniks (disambiguation)
 Penix (surname)
 Phenix (disambiguation)
 Phoenix (disambiguation)